Fort Hoskins was one of three "forts" (which were actually unfortified posts) built by the U.S. Army to monitor the Coastal Indian Reservation in Oregon Territory (later the U.S. State of Oregon) in the mid- 19th century.  The Fort Hoskins Site is listed on the National Register of Historic Places. Fort Hoskins was garrisoned by a number of companies of soldiers throughout its short existence, and future Union Civil War generals Christopher Columbus Augur and Phil Sheridan were stationed there.

History 
Construction on the post began in 1856 on the Luckiamute River under the supervision of then Captain Christopher C. Augur. Fort Hoskins was finished in 1857, with then-lieutenant Philip Sheridan in charge, and was named after Lt. Charles Hoskins, who had died in the Mexican–American War. The fort was located about 19 miles northwest of Corvallis. The community of Hoskins took its name from the fort.

Captain Augur was assigned to Fort Hoskins as its first post commander from 25 July 1856 to 2 July 1861. He and his growing family became the first occupants of their newly constructed residence on Fort Hoskin's "Officer's Row." 2nd Lt. Phil Sheridan oversaw the construction of Fort Hoskins during this period. Two soldiers who were stationed at the fort during the American Civil War kept journals of their experiences: Royal A. Bensell and William M. Hilleary. Their accounts are of unmitigated boredom and dampness, but they provide a good picture of 19th-century life in the area.

Fort Hoskins played an indirectly important role in local and state history because of the leadership of several out-of-state soldiers who decided to stay in the area after they were mustered out of the army. Several placenames in the area, such as Kings Valley, are connected with these soldiers. The fort never saw any action, though a bloodless insurrection by Native Americans at Yaquina Bay was put down by the soldiers. After the Civil War ended, it was discovered that Fort Hoskins had been an outpost of interest to the former Confederate government. Fort Hoskins was abandoned in 1865.

Archeological site
The site of the fort was listed on the National Register of Historic Places in 1974.

In 2002, Benton County opened the site as Fort Hoskins Historical Park. In 2012, the fort commander's house was moved back to its original site at Fort Hoskins from nearby Pedee, where it had been moved after the fort was closed. In 2015, Benton County approved funds for an exterior restoration of the house.

See also
 4th Regiment of California Infantry
 Fort Dalles
 Fort Yamhill

References

Further reading 
 Bensell, Royal A.; Barth, Gunther (ed.) (1959) All Quiet on the Yamhill: The Civil War in Oregon: The Journal of Corporal Royal A. Bensell, Company D, Fourth California Infantry.
 Brauner, David R.; Stricker, Nahani A. (2006) Fort Hoskins Illustrated: An Archaeologist Reflects.
 Hilleary, William M.; Nelson, Herbert B. and Preston, E. Onstad (ed.) (1965) A Webfoot Volunteer: The Diary of William M. Hilleary 1864-1866.
 Hoop, Oscar Winslow "History of Fort Hoskins, 1856-65", Oregon Historical Quarterly, 30 (1929), pp. 346-361
 Onstad, Preston E. "The Fort on the Luckiamute: A Resurvey of Fort Hoskins", Oregon Historical Quarterly, 65 (1964), pp. 173-196

External links
 Fort Hoskins Historical Park
 Sovereigns of Themselves: A Liberating History of Oregon and Its Coast, Vol. VII, a self-published history

1857 establishments in Oregon Territory
1865 disestablishments in Oregon
Hoskins
Closed installations of the United States Army
County parks in Oregon
Hoskins
Hoskins
Landmarks in Oregon
National Register of Historic Places in Benton County, Oregon
Oregon in the American Civil War
Parks in Benton County, Oregon